Stanwick Lakes is a country park on the outskirts of the village of Stanwick and was opened in 2006. It is managed by the Rockingham Forest Trust on behalf of East Northamptonshire District Council and comprises 750 acres (304 hectares) of former gravel pits. It is part of the larger River Nene Regional Park.

History

Prior to the construction of a bypass and mass excavation of gravel, a Roman villa was excavated in 1984–1992 and several mosaics were found.  In 2013, one of the mosaics was returned after study and is now on display in the Visitor Centre at Stanwick Lakes.

A medieval village was excavated in 1985-1989 near to the village of Ringstead. The earthworks and buried archaeological remains of the medieval village of West Cotton, including a mid-late Anglo-Saxon and medieval settlement abandoned before 1450. The settlement overlies the north end of an extensive prehistoric ceremonial complex.

Geography

Stanwick Lakes is approximately 15 miles north-east of Northampton.

Landmarks

The following buildings and structures are listed by Historic England as of special architectural or historic interest.

Raunds bowl barrow (Scheduled Monument) Prehistoric 
Irthlingborough bowl barrow (Scheduled Monument) Prehistoric 
Medieval Settlement of West Cotton (Scheduled Monument)

References

External links
 Stanwick Lakes Nature Reserve
 River Nene Regional Park

Country parks in Northamptonshire
North Northamptonshire